This is a list of wars involving the Italian Republic and its predecessor states since the proclamation of the Kingdom of Italy on 17 March 1861, but does not include wars fought by the historic states of Italy. The result of these conflicts follows this legend:

Ancient Rome

Italian Wars of Unification
The Risorgimento movement emerged to unite Italy in the 19th century. Piedmont-Sardinia took the lead in a series of wars to liberate Italy from foreign control. Following three Wars of Italian Independence against the Habsburg Austrians in the north, the Expedition of the Thousand against the Spanish Bourbons in the south, and the Capture of Rome, the unification of the country was completed in 1871 when Rome was declared capital of Italy.

Kingdom of Italy (1861-1946)

Italian Republic (1946-present)

See also
 History of Italy
 Military history of Italy

References

 
Italy
Wars
Wars